Ibáñez may refer to:

People
Adolfo Ibáñez, Chilean politician
Alejandra Ibáñez (born 2000), American wheelchair basketball player
Andy Ibáñez, Cuban baseball player
Carlos Ibáñez del Campo (1877–1960), Chilean military officer and President 1927–1931 and 1952–1958
César Ibáñez (footballer, born 1992), Mexican football player
César Ibáñez (footballer, born 1999), Argentine football player
Chicho Ibáñez (1875–1981), Cuban musician
Saint Domingo Ibáñez de Erquicia (1589–1633), Spanish missionary and Catholic saint
Enrique Vera Ibáñez (born 1954), Mexican/Swedish race walker
Francisco Ibáñez de Peralta (1644–1712), Spanish colonial administrator, Royal Governor of Chile 1700–1709
Francisco Ibáñez Talavera (born 1936), Spanish cartoonist, Mortadelo y Filemón
Germán Pedro Ibáñez (1928–2007), Cuban musical director
Jorge Batlle Ibáñez (born 1927), President of Uruguay 2000–2005
José Ibañez (born 1951), Cuban judoka
José Ibáñez (cyclist) (born 1968), Colombian road cyclist
Luis Ibáñez (born 1988), Argentine football player
Narciso Ibáñez Menta (1912–2004), Spanish actor
Óscar Ibáñez (born 1967), Peruvian football player
Pablo Ibáñez (born 1981), Spanish football player
Paco Ibáñez (born 1934), Spanish singer and musician
Raúl Ibañez (born 1972), baseball player
Raphaël Ibañez (born 1973), French rugby player
Roberto Ibáñez (born 1985), Ecuadorian judoka
Roger Ibañez (born 1998), Brazilian football player
Salvador Ibáñez (1854–1920), Spanish luthier
Sérgio Ibáñez (born 1999), Spanish Paralympic judoka
Vicente Blasco Ibáñez (1867–1928), Spanish novelist, screenwriter and film director

Places
Ibáñez River, Aisén region, Chile
Río Ibáñez, Chile, a commune in the Aisén region named after the river
Adolfo Ibáñez University, Chile
Alonso de Ibáñez Province, Bolivia
Andrés Ibáñez Province, Bolivia
Casas-Ibáñez, a town in Albacete, Spain
Villa Ibáñez, seat of Ullúm Department, Argentina

Other
Ibanez, a Japanese guitar brand

Spanish-language surnames